Tsuji Gettan Sukemochi (辻月丹資茂) (sometimes read as Shukeshige) (1648–1728) was a Japanese swordsman who founded the kenjutsu of Mugai-ryū in 1695.  Tsuji Gettan was born in Masugimura, Omi (Shiga prefecture) as the second son to a local samurai.  At the age of 13, Gettan was sent to Kyoto to train under the revered sensei Yamaguchi Bokushinsai's Yamaguchi-ryū.
Gettan trained with Yamaguchi for thirteen years, receiving Menkyo Kaiden, full-transmission, of Yamaguchi-ryū at the age of twenty-six, in 1674.

Inception of swordplay 
Tsuji Gettan went on a musha shugyō, warrior's pilgrimage, confining himself at Mt. Atago in Kyoto and Mt. Aburahidake in the Omi.

Having pursued time as a Shugyōsha, Gettan traveled to Edo where he decided to open up his own dojo in the Kojimachi district.  While he was incredibly talented with the sword, there were no būshi enrolled at his school.

References

External links 
 Suimokai's article on Tsuji Gettan

1648 births
1725 deaths
Samurai
Japanese swordfighters
Martial arts school founders